Calvisio is a frazione (and parish) of the municipality of Finale Ligure, in Liguria, northern Italy.

Geography

Present-day Calvisio is located near the Sciusa, mainly on the right banks of the stream. There also stands the parish church, built in a neo-Middle Ages style. On monte Tolla slopes, also on the right side of Sciusa Valley but at an elevation of 120 m, is located Lacrêma, the oldest part of the village, also known as Calvisio Vecchio (literally Old Calvisio).

History 
Calvisio area was inhabited by Ligures as confirmed by remains as an ellipse-shaped field encircled by menhirs named Pratorotondo (round meadow).

During the Roman Age the Sciusa Valley was crossed by Via Julia Augusta and maybe some of the stones of that ancient highway were recycled in oldest buildings of the village. Saint Cipriano church was promoted to parish church before 1356.

Calvisio was a separate comune (municipality) until 1868 when, with Varigotti (which also was an autonomous municipality) requested and obtained to be joined with Final Pia. At the time Calvisio had around 500 inhabitants.

It later followed the destiny of Final Pia, which in 1927 was joined to Finale Marina e Finalborgo giving the present-day municipality of Finale Ligure.

References

Bibliography 

 

Frazioni of the Province of Savona
Former municipalities of the Province of Savona